This is a list of notable Rijksmonuments in Drenthe which have articles on the English Wikipedia. They are listed by municipality.

Aa en Hunze

Coevorden

De Wolden

Emmen

Hogeveen

Meppel

Midden-Drenthe

Nordenveld

Tynaarlo

Westerveld

Drenthe